Mohammad Rahmati (Persian: محمد رحمتی ; born 1958 in Yazd) was the Minister of Roads in the two governments of Khatami and Ahmadinejad and the CEO of the Iranian Railway Company.

References 

Government ministers of Iran
Iranian chief executives
1958 births
Living people